The archaeological  hills in Erbil date back to different historical eras, and it was found through the archaeological  survey work  that took place in the Erbil governorate  that this area included the remains of ancient settlements and cities, the most prominent of which Qalinj Agha Hill, Tell Nadir, Kalak Meshak, Qasra, Lashkry, Aliawa,  Helawa, Ali Mawlan, Abdulaziz, Gird Azaban, and  Kurd Qaburstan....

The Kurdistan Region Government is very interested in  archaeological sites, including the hills in the region, despite the difficult challenges that the region faces.
He exerts undeniable efforts in his interest in preserving these antiquities.
and discover its secrets, And communication with the various bodies for research and excavation
For these treasures you need for intensive study and Write the history of the territory again..

List of archaeological mounds in ErbilSource:
 
 Aliawa
 Awena
 Bashtepe
  Gird Abdulaziz
 Gird Azaban
 Gird Dusara Fatah
 Gird-i Kawr Gosk
 Girdi Daghan
 Girdi Dalugul
 Girdi Doghan
 Girdi Hassan Agadar
 Girdi Peshka
 Girdi Qatawi
 Girdi Qawagh
 Girdi Qradka
 Girdi Quri Beg
 Girdi Shaykh Ahmad
 Girdi Sheikh Ahmed
 Girdi Sorbash Khidr - High
 Girdi Sweri
 Girdi Tandura
 Helawa
 Jadida Lak
 Jmka
 Kurd Qaburstan
 Mastawa
 Minara
 Mrishk Khnken
 Qalat Awena
 Qasawat
 Qawagh village
 Tell Abu Shita
 Tell Baqrta
 Tell Khazna
 Tell Sayid Khidr
 Tell Sheena
 Niska
Gird-i Qal Ghan 
Murtka Gawra cemetery
Grd Ashaba 
Dolabakra 
porija cemetery 
Beryat 
khalifa 
Tarjan 
Girdi Damja 
Dusara Jabar
Abasiya 
Ali Mawlan 
Baghlumnara 
Bastam 
Bir Araban
Dalugul Khwaru
Dolaza 
Gameshtapa 
Garasor 
Gird Jotyar 
Gird Lanka village 
Gird Mala 
Gird Qalachogan 
Girda Rasha/Tatarawa 
Girdarasha 
Girdarasha Asad
Girdi Baba Jahfar 
Girdi Daghan 
Girdi Dowlaza 
Girdi Matrab 
Girdi Pir Dawud 
Girdi Qurshaqlu 
Girdi Shaykh Rasul 
Gird-I Sor 
Girdi Tandura
Girdi Tazhi Rash
Gird-i Zaga 
Gozka 
Grd Ashaba 
Grd wasen 
Grd Xateb
Hazza 
Kamid 
Kawlan 
Kawr Gosk 
Kaznazan 
Khadjila cemetery 
Kharaba 
Khirbat Dusara 
Khirbat Hassan Brush 
Khirbat Miran 
Khirbat Quj  
Khirbat Shina Maran 
Khrabat Hasan Broosh
Kilisa 
Kurd Qani - High 
Mamustayani Nuway
Maqbara Abu Shita 
Maqbarat Permagron 
Maqbarat Shaykh Ismail 
Maqbarat Shaykh Khalak 
Mirawa 
Peymara 
Pilingi Mahmud Agha
Pilingi Nadr Shah 
Qabrstani Gird Mela 
Qaburstan Qushtapa Kon 
Qaburstan Razan 
Qalat Awena
Qalat Girda Sher 
Qazi Khana 
Qopaqran 
Qushtapa kon 
Qushtepe 
Said Salman 
Sarawa 
Sha ban shar
Sheikh Musl
Sherawa 
Sheraya 
Sorbash Kakala 
Surezha 
Tandura village
Tell Abu Jerda 
Tell Barur
Tell Lashkry
Tell Qadriya 
Timari Gawra 
Tirpa Spiyan
Zaga
Kawlan
Kawr Gosk
Kaznazan
Khadjila cemetery
Kharaba
Khirbat Dusara
Khirbat Hassan Brush
Khirbat Miran
Khirbat Shina Maran
Khrabat Hasan Broosh
Kilisa
Kurd Qani
Mamustayani Nuway
Maqbara Abu Shita
Maqbarat Permagron
Maqbarat Shaykh Ismail
Maqbarat Shaykh Khalak
Mirawa
Peymara
Pilingi Mahmud Agha
Pilingi Nadr Shah
Qabrstani Gird Mela
Qaburstan Qushtapa Kon
Qaburstan Razan
Qalat Awena
Qalat Girda Sher
Qazi Khana
Qopaqran
Qushtapa kon
Qushtepe
Said Salman
Sarawa
Sha ban shar
Sheikh Musl
Sherawa
Sheraya
Sorbash Kakala
Surezha
Tandura village
Tell Abu Jerda
Tell Barur
Tell Lashkry
Tell Qadriya
Timari Gawra
Tirpa Spiyan
Zaga

Gallery

See also
 Kurd Qaburstan
Erbil

References

Erbil